Timeline of anthropology, 1930–1939

Events
1934
 The Nihon Minzoku Gakkai (Japanese institute of Ethnology) is founded
1937
The Musée de l'Homme is founded

Publications

1934
Patterns of Culture, by Ruth Benedict.
1935
Structure and Function in Primitive Society, by Alfred Radcliffe-Brown
Coral Gardens and Their Magic, by Bronislaw Malinowski
1937
Witchcraft, Oracles and Magic Among the Azande, by E.E. Evans-Pritchard

Births
1930
Lewis Binford
Pierre Bourdieu
Laura Nader
Marshall Sahlins

1934
Maurice Godelier
1935
Roger Keesing
Barbara Myerhoff
1939
Mary Bateson
Maurice Bloch

Deaths
1930
Jessie Walter Fewkes

1934
Ronald Burrage Dixon
Fritz Graebner
Berthold Laufer

1935
Walter Hough
1936
Vladimir Bogoraz
1937
John Napoleon Brinton Hewitt
Vladimir Jochelson
Grafton Elliot Smith
1939
Arthur Maurice Hocart
Lucien Lévy-Bruhl
Edward Sapir

See also

Anthropology by decade
Anthropology
Anthropology timelines